Slavens is a given and surname. Notable people with the name include:

Middle Name
William Slavens McNutt (1885-1938), American screenwriter

Surname
Dian Slavens (born 1958), American politician
J. Paul Slavens (born 1962), American musician
James W. L. Slavens (1838–1905), American businessman and politician
Mark Slavens (born 1954), American politician; husband of Dian
Pēteris Slavens (1874-1919), Latvian Soviet military commander
Samuel Slavens (c.1830-1862), American Civil War soldier

See also
Slaven (given name)
Slaven (surname)

Given names
Surnames